The Harry Elkins Widener Memorial Library is the largest and central library of the Harvard Library system at Harvard University in Cambridge, Massachusetts, the largest university library system in the United States with nearly 20 million holdings. It opened in 1915.

History

The library is named for 1907 Harvard College graduate and book collector Harry Elkins Widener, and was initially funded and built by his mother Eleanor Elkins Widener following her son's death in the sinking of the Titanic in 1912.

The library's holdings, which include works in more than one hundred languages, comprise "one of the world's most comprehensive research collections in the humanities and social sciences."
Its  of shelves, along five miles (8km) of aisles on ten levels, comprise a labyrinth, which one student "could not enter without feeling that she ought to carry a compass, a sandwich, and a whistle."

At the building's heart are the Widener Memorial Rooms, displaying papers and mementos recalling the life and death of Harry Widener, and the Harry Elkins Widener Collection, "the precious group of rare and wonderfully interesting books brought together by Mr. Widener",
to which was later added one of the few perfect Gutenberg Bibles, the object of a 1969 burglary attempt that Harvard's police chief then believed to have been inspired by the 1964 heist filmTopkapi.

Predecessor

Prior to Widener Library's creation, there had been concerns about space limitations and deficiences at Gore Hall, the university's prior library, which was constructed in 1841 when the university housed only 44,00 books.
Harvard librarian Justin Winsor concluded his 1892 Annual Report by pleading, "". Winsor's successor Archibald Cary Coolidge asserted at the time that the Boston Public Library was a better place to write an undergraduate thesis. 

Despite substantial additions in 1876 and 1907, a committee of architects in 1910 reported that Gore Hall was "...unsuitable for its object...No amount of tinkering can make it really good...Hopelessly overcrowded...leaks when there is a heavy rain...intolerably hot in summer...Books are put in double rows and are not infrequently left lying on top of one another, or actually on the floor."

With university librarian William Coolidge Lane reporting that the building's light switches were delivering electric shocks to his staff
and dormitory basements pressed into service as overflow storage for Harvard's 543,000 books, the committee drew up a proposal for replacing Gore Hall in stages. Andrew Carnegie was approached for financing without success.

Death of Harry Widener

Harry Elkins Widener was a scion of two Philadelphia families that were among the wealthiest in America, a 1907 graduate of Harvard College, and an accomplished bibliophile despite his youth. On April 15, 1912, he died in the sinking of the RMS Titanic. His father George Dunton Widener also perished in the ship's sinking, but his mother Eleanor Elkins Widener survived.

Harry Widener's will instructed that his mother, when "in her judgment Harvard University shall make arrangements for properly caring for my collection of books... shall give them to said University to be known as the Harry Elkins Widener Collection", and he told a friend, not long before he died, "I want to be remembered in connection with a great library, (but) I do not see how it is going to be brought about."

To enable the fulfillment of her son's wishes, Eleanor Widener briefly considered funding an addition to Gore Hall, but soon opted instead to build a completely new and far larger library building that would serve as a perpetual memorial  to Harry Widener, housing not only his personal book collection but all of Harvard's general library with room for growth.

As Harvard University history and literature professor Steven Biel wrote in his 1996 book on the Titanic, The Harvard architect committee's Beaux Arts design for Gore Hall's projected replacement, "with its massiveness and symmetry, offered monumentality with nothing more particular to monumentalize than the aspirations of the modern university" until the Titanic sank and, according to Biel delicate negotiation allowed Harvard to convince Eleanor Widener that the most eloquent tribute to Harry would be an entire library rather than a rare book wing."

Terms and cost of gift

Eleanor Widener attached a number of stipulations to her gift, including that the project's architects be the firm led by Horace Trumbauer. which had built several mansions for both the Elkins and the Widener families. "Mrs. Widener does not give the University the money to build a new library, but has offered to build a library satisfactory in external appearance to herself," Harvard President A. Lawrence Lowell wrote privately. "The exterior was her own choice, and she has decided architectural opinions."
Harvard historian William Bentinck-Smith wrote that, to Harvard officials, Mrs. Widener was a lovely and generous lady whose wealth, power, and remoteness made her a somewhat terrifying figure who must not be roused to annoyance or outrage. Once [construction] began, all financial transactions were the donor's private business, and no one at Harvard ever knew the exact cost. Mrs. Widener was counting on $2million, [but] it is probable the cost exceeded $3.5million [equivalent to $ million in ].

Eleanor Widener expressed annoyance at newspapers' misreporting of the circumstances of her gift, writing to Lowell, "I want emphasized...that the library is a memorial to my dear son, to be known as the 'Harry Elkins Widener Memorial Library,' given by me and not his (paternal grandfather P. A. B. Widener as has been so often stated." Her second husband Alexander H. Rice Jr. later insisted that Lowell do his best "to see that in all official reports, etc. the Library is referred to as the Harry Elkins Widener Memorial LibraryWidener! Not one cent of Widener money, one second of Widener thought, nor one ounce of Widener energy were expended on either the conception or construction of the Library."

Though Harvard awarded Trumbauer an honorary degree on the day of the new library's dedication, it was Trumbauer associate Julian F. Abele who had overall responsibility for the building's design, which largely followed the 1910 architects' committee's outline, though with the committee's central circulation room shifted from the center to the northeast corner, yielding pride of place to the Memorial Rooms. 

Library Journal reported, "The building has administrative disadvantages necessitate by its character as a memorial, with a central fane housing the private library collected by young Widener... This occupies what would otherwise be the central court and cuts off access from the stack except at the two ends, but is scarcely to be criticized in view of the splendor of the gift and the parental affection thus enshrined and perpetuated by Mrs. Widener."

After Gore Hall was demolished to make way, ground was broken on February 12, 1913, and the cornerstone laid June 16. Later in 1913, some 50,000 bricks were being laid each day.

Building

Located in the center of the Harvard campus  directly across Tercentenary Theatre from Memorial Church, Widener Library is a hollow rectangle of "Harvard brick with Indiana limestone traceries", 250 by 200 by 80feet high (76 by 61 by 24m) and enclosing 320,000 square feet (30,000m),
"colonnaded on its front by immense pillars with elaborate [Corinthian capitals], all of which stand at the head of a flight of stairs that would not disgrace the capitol in Washington."
Sources describe the building's style as (variously) Beaux-Arts, Georgian, Hellenistic, or "the austere, formalistic Imperial style displayed in the Law School's Langdell Hall and the Medical School Quadrangle".

The east, south, and west wings house the stacks, while the north contains administrative offices and various reading rooms, including the Main Reading Room, which is now the Loker Reading Room, spanning the entire front of the building and some 42feet (13m) in both depth and height, was termed by architectural historian Bainbridge Bunting "the most ostentatious interior space at Harvard." A topmost floor, supported by the stacks framework itself, contains 32 rooms for special collections, studies, offices, and seminars.

The Memorial Rooms are in the building's center between what were originally two light courts now enclosed as additional reading rooms.

Dedication

The building was dedicated immediately after Commencement Day exercises on June24, 1915.
Lowell and Coolidge mounted the steps to the main door, where Eleanor Widener presented them with the building's keys.
The first book formally brought into the new library was the 1634 edition of John Downame's The Christian Warfare Against the Devil, World, and Flesh,  believed (at the time) to be the only volume, of those bequeathed to the school by John Harvard in 1636, to have survived the 1764 burning of Harvard Hall.

In the Memorial Rooms, after a benediction by Bishop William Lawrence, a portrait of Harry Widener was unveiled, then remarks delivered by Senator Henry Cabot Lodge, who referenced "The Meaning of a Great Library" on behalf of Eleanor Widener, and Lowell, who said, "For years, we have longed for a library that would serve our purpose, but we never hoped to see such a library as this". The Boston Evening Transcript) "reported that, after the dedication, "the doors were thrown open, and both graduates and undergraduates had an opportunity to see the beauties and utilities of this important university acquisition." "I hope it will become the heart of the University," Eleanor Widener said, "a centre for all the interests that make Harvard a great university."

The central Memorial Roomsan outer rotunda housing memorabilia of the life and death of Harry Widener, and an inner library displaying the 3300 rare books collected by himwere described by the Boston Sunday Herald soon after the dedication:

Conversely, "even from the very entrance [of the building] one will catch a glimpse in the distance of the portrait of young Harry Widener on the further wall [of the Memorial Rooms], if the intervening doors happen to be open."

Eleanor Widener hosted Commencement Day luncheons for many years in the Memorial Rooms.
The family underwrites their upkeep,
including weekly renewal of the flowersoriginally roses but now carnations.

Amenities and deficiencies
Touted as "the last word in library construction", the new building's amenities included telephones, pneumatic tubes, book lifts and conveyors, elevators, and a dining-room and kitchenette "for the ladies of the staff".
Advertisements for the manufacturer of the building's shelving highlighted its "dark brown enamel finish, harmonizing with oak trim",
and special interchangeable regular and oversize shelves meant that books on a given subject could be shelved together regardless of size.

The Library Journal reported in 1915 that, "especially interesting not so much the spacious and lofty reading rooms" as the innovation of placing student carrels and private faculty studies directly in the stack, reflecting Lowell's desire to put "the massive resources of the stack close to the scholar's hand, reuniting books and readers in an intimacy that nineteenth-century ['closed-stack' library designs] had long precluded".
(Competition for the seventy coveted faculty studies has been a longstanding administrative headache.)

Certain deficiencies, however, were soon noted. A primitive form of air conditioning was abandoned within a few months. "The need of better toilet facilities [in the stacks] has been pressed upon us during the past year by several rather distressing experiences," Widener Superintendent Frank Carney wrote discreetly in 1918.

And after a university-wide search for castoff furniture left many of the stacks' 300 carrels still unequipped, Coolidge wrote to  "There is something rather humiliating in having to proclaim to the world that  [Widener offers] unequalled opportunity to the scholar and investigator who wishes to come here, but that in order to use these opportunities he must bring his own chair, table and electric lamp."
(A week later Coolidge wrote again: "Your very generous gift [has helped] pull me out of a most desperate situation.")

Later built tunnels, from the stacks level furthest underground, connect to nearby Pusey Library, Lamont Library,
and Houghton Library. An enclosed bridge connecting to Houghton's reading room via a Widener windowbuilt after Eleanor Widener's heirs agreed to waive her gift's proscription of exterior additions or alterationswas removed in 2004.
(Houghton and Lamont were built in the 1940s to relieve Widener, which had become simultaneously too smallits shelves were fulland too largeits immense size and complex catalog made books difficult to locate.

But with Harvard's collections doubling every 17 years, by 1965 Widener was again close to full,
prompting construction of Pusey, and in the early 1980s library officials "pushed the panic button" again, leading to the construction of the Harvard Depository.)

Collections and stacks

The 90-unit Harvard Library system, of which Widener is the anchor, is the only academic library among the world's five "megalibraries"Widener, the New York Public Library, the Library of Congress, France's Bibliothèque Nationale, and the British Librarymaking it "unambiguously the greatest university library in the world," in the words of a Harvard official.

According to the Harvard College Library's own description, Widener's humanities and social sciences collections include
 The building's 3.5 million volumes occupy  of shelves along five miles (8km) of aisles on ten levels divided into three wings each.

Alone among the "megalibraries", only Harvard allows patrons the "long-treasured privilege" of entering the general-collections stacks to browse as they please, instead of requesting books through library staff.
Until a recent renovation the stacks had little signage"There was the expectation that if you were good enough to qualify to get into the stacks you certainly didn't need any help" (as one official put it)
so that "learning to [find books in] Widener was like a rite of passage, a test of manhood",
and a 1979 monograph on library design complained, "After one goes through the main doors of Harvard's Widener Library, the only visible sign says merely ENTER."
At times color-coded lines and shoeprints have been applied to the floors to help patrons keep their bearings.

As of 2015 some 1700 persons enter the building each day, and about 2800 books are checked out.
Another 3million Widener items reside offsite (along with many millions of items from other Harvard libraries) at the Harvard Depository in Southborough, Massachusetts, from which they are retrieved overnight on request. A project to insert barcodes into each book, begun in the late 1970s, had some 1million volumes yet to reach as of 2006.

Harry Elkins Widener Collection

The works displayed in the Memorial Rooms comprise Harry Widener's collection at the time of his death, "major monuments of English letters, many remarkable for their bindings and illustrations or unusual provenance":

Shakespeare first folios;
a copy of Poems written by Wil.Shake-speare, gent. (1640) in its original sheepskin binding;
an inscribed copy of Boswell's Life of Samuel Johnson; Johnson's own Bible ("used so much by its owner that several pages were worn out and Johnson copied them over in his own writing");
and first editions, presentation copies, and similarly valuable volumes of Robert Louis Stevenson, Thackeray, Charlotte Brontë, Blake, George Cruikshank, Isaac Cruikshank, Robert Cruikshank
and Dickensincluding the petty cash book kept by Dickens while a young law clerk.
Book collector George Sidney Hellman, writing soon after Harry Widener's death, observed that he was "not satisfied alone in having a rare book or a rare book inscribed by the author; it was with him a prerequisite that the volume should be in immaculate condition."

Harry Widener "died suddenly, just as he was beginning to be one of the world's great collectors,"
said the Collection's first curator.
"They formed a young man's library, and are to be preserved as he left it"except
that the Widener family has the exclusive privilege of adding to it.

Harvard's "greatest typographical treasure"
is one of the only thirty-eight perfect copies extant of the Gutenberg Bible,
purchased while Harry was abroad by his grandfather Peter A.B. Widener (who had intended to surprise Harry with it once the Titanic docked in New York) and added to the Collection by the Widener family in 1944. Like all Harvard's valuable books, works in the Widener Collection may be consulted by researchers demonstrating a genuine research need.

Like many large libraries, Widener originally classified its holdings according to its own idiosyncratic systemthe "Widener" (or "Harvard") systemwhich (writes Battles) follows "the division of knowledge in its [early twentieth-century] formulation. The Aus class contains books on the Austro-Hungarian Empire; the Ott class serves the purpose for the Ottoman Empire. Dante, Molière, and Montaigne each gets a class of his own."

In the 1970s new arrivals began to be classified according to a modified version of the Library of Congress system.
The two systems' differences reflect "competing theories of knowledge... In a sense, the [old] Widener system was Aristotelian; its divisions were empirical, describing and reflecting the languages and cultural origins of books and highlighting their relations to one another in language, place, and time; [the Library of Congress system], by contrast, was Platonic, looking past the surface of language and nation to reflect the idealized, essential discipline in which each [item] might be said to belong."

Because of the impracticality of reclassifying millions of books, those received before the changeover remain under their original "Widener" classifications. Thus among works on a given subject, older books will be found at one shelf location (under a "Widener" classification) and newer ones at another (under a related Library of Congress classification).

In addition, an accident of the building's layout led to the development of two separate card catalogsthe "Union" catalog and the "Public" cataloghoused on different floors and having a complex interrelationship "which perplexed students and faculty alike." It was not until the 1990s that the electronic Harvard On-Line Library Information System was able to completely supplant both physical catalogs.

Departmental and special libraries
The building also houses a number of special libraries in dedicated spaces outside the stacks, includeing:

There are also special collections in the history of science, linguistics, Near Eastern languages and civilizations, paleography, and Sanskrit.

The contents of the Treasure Room, holding Harvard's most precious rare books and manuscripts (other than the Harry Elkins Widener Collection itself) were transferred to newly built Houghton Library in 1942.

In literature and legend

Swim requirement, icecream, and other legends

Legend holds that to spare future Harvard men her son's fate, Eleanor Widener insisted, as a condition of her gift, that learning to swim be made a requirement for graduation. This requirement, the Harvard Crimson once reported erroneously, was "dropped in the late 1970s because it was deemed discriminatory against physically disabled students".) 
"Among the many myths relating to Harry Elkins Widener, this is the most prevalent", says Harvard's "Ask a Librarian" service. Though Harvard has had swimming requirements at various times (e.g. for rowers on the Charles River, or as a now-defunct test for entering freshmen)
Bentinck-Smith writes that "There is absolutely no evidence... that [Eleanor Widener] was, as a result of the Titanic disaster, in any way responsible for [any] compulsory swimming test."

Another story, holding that Eleanor Widener donated a further sum to underwrite perpetual availability of ice cream (purportedly Harry Widener's favorite dessert) in Harvard dining halls, is also without foundation.
A Widener curator's compilation of "fanciful oral history" recited by student tour guides includes "Flowers mysteriously appear every morning outside the Widener Room" and "Harry used to have carnations dyed crimson to remind him of Harvard, and so his mother kept up the tradition" in the flowers displayed in the Memorial Rooms.

Literary references
In H. P. Lovecraft's fictional universe Cthulhu Mythos, Widener is one of five libraries holding a 17th-century edition of the Necronomicon, hidden somewhere in the stacks.

Thomas Wolfe, who earned a Harvard master's degree in 1922, told Max Perkins that he spent most of his Harvard years in Widener's reading room. He wrote of  through the stacks of that great library like some damned soul, never at restever leaping ahead from the pages I read to thoughts of those I want to read"; his alter ego Eugene Gant read with a watch in his hand, "laying waste of the shelves."

Historian Barbara Tuchman considered "the single most formative experience" of her career the writing of her undergraduate thesis, for which she was "allowed to have as my own one of those little cubicles with a table under a window" in the Widener stacks, which were "my Archimedes' bathtub, my burning bush, my dish of mold where I found my personal penicillin."

Burglary and other incidents

Over the years, Widener has been the scene of various criminal exploits "infamous for their fecklessness and ignominity."

In 1931, former graduate student Joel C. Williams was arrested after attempting to sell two Harvard library books to a local book dealer. Charles Apted and other Harvard officials visited Williams' home
where (posing as "book buyers" to spare the feelings of Williams' family)
they found thousands of books which Williams had stolen over the years, many badly damaged. The "absolutely crazy" Williams would "go to students studying in Widener and ask them what course they were taking. He would then borrow all the books for that course in the library. Then no one could get any to study", library official John E. Shea later recalled.

Despite the misleading implication of bookplates placed in the 2504 recovered books, Harvard's charges against Williams were dropped after he was indicted on book-theft charges in another jurisdiction, which imposed a sentence of hard labor. After the unrelated arrest of a book-theft ring operating at Harvard, there was a "noticeable increase in the number of missing books secretly returned to the library", the Transcript reported in 1932.

Gutenberg Bible theft

On the night of August 19, 1969, an attempt was made to steal the library's Gutenberg Bible, valued at $1million (equivalent to $ million in ).
Equipped with a hammer, pry bar, and other burglarious implements,
the 20-year-old would-be thief hid in a lavatory until after closing, then made his way to the roof, from which he descended via a knotted rope to break through a Memorial Room window.
But after smashing the bible's display case and placing its two volumes in a knapsack, he found the additional 70 pounds (32kg) made it impossible for him to reclimb the rope.

until his moans were heard by a janitor;
he was found about 1a.m.
with injuries including a fractured skull.
"It looks like a professional job all right, in the fact that he came down the rope," commented Harvard Police Chief Robert Tonis. "But it doesn't look very professional that he fell off."
Tonis speculated that the attempt may have been modeled on a similar caper depicted in the 1964 filmTopkapi,
though a retired Harvard librarian later commented that the thief (who was later judged insane) "evidently knew nothing about booksor, at least, about selling them... There was no explanation of what he expected to do with the Bible."

Only the books' bindings (which were "not valuable [and] did just what a good binding is supposed to do: they protected the inside contents") were damaged.
Since the incident only one or the other Bible volume is on display at any given time
and a replica has been substituted at times of heightened security concern.

The Slasher
Around 1990, empty bindings stripped of their pages began to appear in the Widener stacks. Eventually some 600 mutilated books were discovered, the vandal particularly targeting works on early Christianity in Greek, Latin, or unusual languages such as Icelandic.
Notes left at Widener, and later at Northeastern University, threatened graphically described mutilations of library workers, cyanide gas attacks,
and bombings of libraries and a local bank.
Other notes instructed that $500,000 be left in a Northeastern library, demanded that Northeastern "terminate all Jew personnel", and directed that $1million be left in the Widener stacks:

These "ransom drops" were staked out by the FBI,
and surveillance cameras installed in ersatz books, without result.

In 1994, police connected an incident at Northeastern, in which a library worker there (a former Widener employee) was caught stealing chemistry books, with the fact that chemistry texts had been among the works mutilated at Widener.
Officials found "a kind of renegade reference room" in the worker's basement,
includeing library books, piles of ripped-out pages, a microfilm camera, and hundreds of unusable microfilms he had haphazardly made of the books (worth $180,000) he had destroyed.
At trial "The Slasher" said he had acted in revenge for the eighteen months he had been detained in a state psychiatric hospital after expiration of a six-month jail term he had received for a minor offense.

Artwork

Two of Gore Hall's granite pinnacles were preserved, and flank Widener's rear entrance.

In the 1920s, the university commissioned John Singer Sargent to paint, within the fourteen-foot-high arched panels flanking the entrance to the Memorial Rooms, two murals giving tribute to Harvard's World WarI dead: Death and Victory and Entering the War.
The accompanying inscription, by Lowell, reads: "Happy those who with a glowing faith/ In one embrace clasped Death and Victory".
With Memorial Church, which directly faces Widener, these constitute what the Boston Public Library calls "the most elaborate World WarI memorial in the Boston area."

Above the Memorial Rooms entrance is inscribed:

(Eleanor Elkins Widener became Eleanor Elkins Rice when, in October 1915, she married Harvard professor and surgeon
Alexander Hamilton Rice, Jr.,
a noted South American explorer whom she had met at the library's dedication four months earlier. She died in 1937.)

On the second floor is a bronze bust by Albin Polasek of sculptor and muralist Frank Millet, who had also died on the Titanic.
In the main reading room is a sculpture of George Washington; on the stairs to the third floor a sculpture of John Elbridge Hudson; and on the ground floor a sculpture of Henry Ware Wales,
as well as vaulted hallways"just like the Oyster Bar at Grand Central... astounding", according to historian Thomas Gickby Rafael Guastavino, who (with his son) also designed and built domes and vaults in buildings such as Carnegie Hall, the Cathedral of St. John the Divine, and the Boston Public Library.

Three dioramas depicting the grounds, buildings, and vicinity of Harvard Yard in 1667, 1775, and 1936 were installed behind the main stairs in 1947, but removed during renovations in 2004.
A six-foot-square bronze tablet, featuring a bas relief of Gore Hall, is at the exterior northwest corner. Its inscription reads in part:

Restrictions on women

The building originally included a separate Radcliffe Reading Room behind the card catalogs"barely large enough for a single table"to which female students were restricted "for fear their presence would distract the studious Harvard men" in the main reading room.
In 1923 a sequence of communications between Librarian William Coolidge Lane and another Harvard official dealt with "the incident of Miss Alexander's intrusion into the reading room", and Keyes Metcalf, Director of University Libraries from 1937 to 1955, wrote that early in his tenure a Classics professor "rushed into my office, looking as if he were about to have an apoplectic stroke, and gasped, 'I've just been in the reading room, and there is a Radcliffe girl in there! By then female graduate students were permitted to enter the stacks, but only until 5p.m., "after which time it was thought they would not be safe there".

"Even the ever-present problem of inadequate lavatories worked to deny functional access to women", wrote Battles. "Patrons requesting directions to a women's restroom were routinely misled, denied access, or simply told that such things did not exist at a college for men such as Harvard."

By World WarII (Elizabeth Colson recalled years later) "we could go into the [Main Reading Room] and use the encyclopedias and things like that there, if we stood up, but we couldn't sit down",
and only by special permission (which even female faculty members had to request in writing) could a woman work in the building in the evening.

Renovation

A five-year, $97million renovation completed in 2004, the first since the building opened, added fire suppression and environmental control systems, upgraded wiring and communications, remodeled various public spaces, and enclosed the light courts to create additional reading rooms
(beneath which several levels of new offices and mechanical equipment were hidden).
"Claustrophobia-inducing" elevators were replaced,
the bottom shelves on the lowest stacks level were removed in recognition of chronic seepage problems,
Widener's "olfactory nostalgia... actually the smell of decaying books" was addressed,
and unrestricted light and airseen as desirable when Widener was built but now considered "public enemies one and two for the long-term safety of old books"were brought under control.

Some changes required that the Widener family grant relief from the terms of Eleanor Widener's gift, which forbade that "structures of any kind [be] erected in the courts around which the [Library] is constructed, but that the same shall be kept open for light and air".
The need to relocate each of the building's 3.5million volumes twicefirst to temporary locations, then to new permanent locations, as work proceeded aisle by aislewas turned to advantage, so that by the end of the renovation related materials in the library's two classification systems (see § Parallel classification systems) were physically adjacent for the first time;
the chart showing the floor and wing location, within the stacks, of each subject classification was revised sixty-five times during construction.
The project received the 2005 Library Building Award from the American Library Association and the American Institute of Architects.

Notes

References

 

Other sources cited

External links

Official website

1915 establishments in Massachusetts
Harvard Library
Harvard Square
Harvard University buildings
Horace Trumbauer buildings
Libraries in Middlesex County, Massachusetts
Library buildings completed in 1915
University and college academic libraries in the United States
Widener family